Erik Michael Cordier (born February 25, 1986) is an American former professional baseball pitcher. He made his Major League Baseball (MLB) debut with the San Francisco Giants in 2014.

Career

Kansas City Royals
The Kansas City Royals selected Cordier in the second round of the 2004 Major League Baseball Draft out of Southern Door High School near Brussels in Door County, Wisconsin.

Atlanta Braves/Pittsburgh Pirates
He was traded from the Royals to the Atlanta Braves for Tony Peña Jr. on March 24, 2007. Cordier played in the Braves organization from 2008 to 2012, and the Pittsburgh Pirates organization in 2013.

San Francisco Giants
Cordier signed with the San Francisco Giants after the 2013 season, and was added to their 40-man roster.

Cordier was called up to the majors for the first time on September 2, 2014. He made his MLB debut on September 3 with a 101 mph fastball. For the season with the Giants, he was 0–0 with a 1.50 ERA and 9 strikeouts in 6 innings.

Cordier was designated for assignment by the Giants on May 17, 2015. He was outrighted to Triple-A Fresno on May 27, and elected free agency on May 30. On June 1, he was re-signed to a minor league deal by the club, and was released on August 1.

Miami Marlins
On August 5, Miami signed Cordier to a minor league deal. He was added to the 40-man roster on August 17, and made 8 appearances with the Marlins, going 0–0 with a 5.84 ERA. His four-seam fastball had the second-highest average speed of any MLB pitcher's pitches in 2015, at 98.4 mph. He elected free agency in October 2015 after being outrighted off Miami's 40-man roster.

Orix Buffaloes
Cordier signed with the Orix Buffaloes of Nippon Professional Baseball for the 2016 season. With them he was 0–2 with two saves and a 7.30 ERA, and 14 strikeouts in 12.1 innings.

Boston Red Sox
He signed a minor league contract with the Boston Red Sox on January 18, 2017. After a couple of months in the organization, during which Cordier was 0–1 with one save and a 5.40 ERA and 15 strikeouts in 8.1 innings for Pawtucket, he was released on May 16.

References

External links

1986 births
Living people
Sportspeople from Green Bay, Wisconsin
Baseball players from Wisconsin
Major League Baseball pitchers
San Francisco Giants players
Miami Marlins players
Arizona League Royals players
Idaho Falls Chukars players
Burlington Bees players
Gulf Coast Braves players
Rome Braves players
Myrtle Beach Pelicans players
Mississippi Braves players
Phoenix Desert Dogs players
Gwinnett Braves players
Surprise Saguaros players
Indianapolis Indians players
Fresno Grizzlies players
San Jose Giants players
Sacramento River Cats players
New Orleans Zephyrs players
Orix Buffaloes players
American expatriate baseball players in Japan